The index of physics articles is split into multiple pages due to its size.

To navigate by individual letter use the table of contents below.

B

B-factory
B-tagging
B-theory of time
B. V. Bowden, Baron Bowden
B2FH paper
BBGKY hierarchy
BCS: 50 Years (book)
BCS theory
BESS (experiment)
BESSY
BF model
BKL singularity
BL Lac object
BOOMERanG experiment
BPST instanton
BRST formalism
BRST quantization
BTZ black hole
BTeV experiment
BX442
B Reactor
B meson
B − L
BaBar experiment
Baby brane
Bach tensor
Back-reaction
Back pressure
Back scattering alignment
Background-oriented schlieren technique
Background count
Background field method
Background independence
Background noise
Background radiation
Backscatter
Backscatter X-ray
Backward-wave media
Backward wave oscillator
Bad Science: The Short Life and Weird Times of Cold Fusion
Bagger–Lambert–Gustavsson action
Bagnold formula
Bahram Mashhoon
Baien Tomlin
Baikal Deep Underwater Neutrino Telescope
Bainbridge mass spectrometer
Baksan Neutrino Observatory
Bak–Tang–Wiesenfeld sandpile
Baldwin–Lomax model
Balfour Stewart
Ball bearing motor
Ball lightning
Ballistic coefficient
Ballistic conduction
Ballistic galvanometer
Ballistic pendulum
Ballistic reentry
Ballistic transport
Ballotechnics
Balmer series
Balseiro Institute
Balthasar van der Pol
Balázs Győrffy
Banana equivalent dose
Band bending
Band diagram
Band gap
Band mapping
Band of stability
Band offset
Bandwidth-limited pulse
Banesh Hoffmann
Bangladesh Council of Scientific and Industrial Research
Banked turn
Banks–Zaks fixed point
Barber–Layden–Power effect
Bare mass
Bargeboard (aerodynamics)
Bargmann's limit
Bargmann–Wigner equations
Barkhausen effect
Barlow's law
Barlow lens
Barn (unit)
Barnett effect
Baroclinity
Barotropic
Barotropic vorticity equation
Barrel (disambiguation)
Barrett–Crane model
Barry M. McCoy
Barry Simon
Barton's Pendulums
Barton Zwiebach
Baryogenesis
Baryon
Baryon Oscillation Spectroscopic Survey
Baryon acoustic oscillations
Baryon asymmetry
Baryon number
Baryon spectroscopy
Baryonic dark matter
Bas Pease
Bascom S. Deaver
Base conditions
Basic concepts of quantum mechanics
Basic physics of the violin
Basil Hiley
Basil Schonland
Basilis C. Xanthopoulos
Bass trap
Basset force
Basset–Boussinesq–Oseen equation
Batalin–Vilkovisky formalism
Batchelor vortex
Bathochromic shift
Battelle Memorial Institute
Beale number
Beam crossing
Beam diameter
Beam divergence
Beam dump
Beam emittance
Beam expander
Beam homogenizer
Beam parameter product
Beam propagation method
Beam splitter
Beamline
Beard and Chuang model
Beat (acoustics)
Beatrice Tinsley
Beaufort scale
Beckmann thermometer
Becquerel
Bedford Level experiment
Beer–Lambert law
Beetle (ASIC)
Behavior of nuclear fuel during a reactor accident
Behram Kurşunoğlu
Beijing Electron–Positron Collider II
Bejan number
Bekenstein bound
Bel decomposition
Belinski–Zakharov transform
Bell's spaceship paradox
Bell's theorem
Bell Labs
Bell mouth
Bell test experiments
Belle experiment
Belousov–Zhabotinsky reaction
Belt of Venus
Beltrami vector field
Ben Lockspeiser
Ben Roy Mottelson
Bending
Bending moment
Benedict Friedlaender
Benedict–Webb–Rubin equation
Bengt Edlén
Benjamin Fain
Benjamin Markarian
Benjamin Schumacher
Benjamin W. Lee
Benjamin–Bona–Mahony equation
Bennett Lewis
Benny Lautrup
Beno Gutenberg
Benoît Paul Émile Clapeyron
Berendsen thermostat
Bergmann's rule
Berkeley Physics Course
Bernard Brunhes (physicist)
Bernard Cohen (physicist)
Bernard Eastlund
Bernard F. Schutz
Bernard H. Lavenda
Bernard Haisch
Bernard Julia
Bernard Katz
Bernard Lovell
Bernard Picinbono
Bernard T. Feld
Bernard d'Espagnat
Bernard de Wit
Bernardo Huberman
Bernhard Caesar Einstein
Bernhard Philberth
Bernhard Schmidt
Bernoulli's principle
Berry connection and curvature
Bert Broer
Bert Schroer
Berta Karlik
Bertha Swirles
Bertram Batlogg
Bertram Boltwood
Bertram Brockhouse
Bertram Eugene Warren
Bertrand's theorem
Bertrand Halperin
Berzelium
Beta-M
Beta-decay stable isobars
Beta (plasma physics)
Beta (velocity)
Beta barium borate
Beta decay
Beta function (disambiguation)
Beta function (physics)
Beta particle
Beta plane
Beta rays
Betatron
Bethe ansatz
Bethe formula
Bethe lattice
Bethe–Bloch formula
Bethe–Feynman formula
Bethe–Salpeter equation
Bethe–Weizsäcker formula
Bethe–Weizsäcker process
Betti's theorem
Betz' law
Bevatron
Beverly Clock
Beyond Einstein (book)
Beyond Einstein program
Bhabha scattering
Bhangmeter
Bhatnagar–Gross–Krook operator
Bhāskara's wheel
Bi-hemispherical reflectance
Bi-isotropic material
Bi-scalar tensor vector gravity
Biaxial nematic
Bibcode
Bibliography of popular physics books
Bicycle and motorcycle dynamics
Bidirectional reflectance distribution function
Bidirectional scattering distribution function
Biefeld–Brown effect
Biermann battery
Biexciton
Bifilar coil
Bifurcation theory
Big Bang
Big Bang (book)
Big Bang nucleosynthesis
Big Bounce
Big Crunch
Big European Bubble Chamber
Big Freeze
Big Rip
Bilayer
Bilepton
Bill Wattenburg
Billiard-ball computer
Bimetallic strip
Bimetric theory
Bimoment
Binary entropy function
Binary pulsar
Binary star
Binder parameter
Binding energy
Binet equation
Bingham plastic
Binocular disparity
Binoviewer
Bioacoustics
Bioceramic
Bioelectromagnetics
Bioelectromagnetism
Biogeophysics
Biological thermodynamics
Biological transmutation
Biomaterial
Biomechanics
Bion (physics)
Biophoton
Biophotonics
Biophysical Journal
Biophysical Society
Biophysical techniques
Biophysics
Biot number
Biot–Savart law
Biplane
Bipolaron
Biquaternion
Birch's law
Birch–Murnaghan equation of state
Bird flight
Birefringence
Birkeland current
Birkhoff's theorem (electromagnetism)
Birkhoff's theorem (relativity)
Birmingham Solar Oscillations Network
Bismuth strontium calcium copper oxide
Bispectral analysis
Bispinor
Bistatic Doppler shift
Bistatic range
Bivector
Bjarne Tromborg
Bjerrum defect
Björn Engquist
Bjørn Wiik
Black-Body Theory and the Quantum Discontinuity
Black-hole cosmology
BlackLight Power
Black Holes and Time Warps
Black Star (semiclassical gravity)
Black body
Black brane
Black hole
Black hole bomb
Black hole complementarity
Black hole electron
Black hole information paradox
Black hole starship
Black hole thermodynamics
Black light
Black noise
Black silicon
Black star (semiclassical gravity)
Black string
Blackbody infrared radiative dissociation
Blackburn pendulum
Blackett effect
Blade element theory
Blade pitch
Blaise Pascal
Blake number
Blandford–Znajek process
Blas Cabrera
Blas Cabrera Felipe
Blasius boundary layer
Blast wave
Blazar
Blended wing body
Blinking colloidal nanocrystals
Bloch-Grüneisen temperature
Bloch wall
Bloch's theorem
Bloch wave – MoM method
Bloom (test)
Blown flap
Blue laser
Blue shift
Blueshift
Bo Sundqvist
Bo Thidé
Bob (physics)
Bob White (geophysicist)
Body centred cubic metal
Body moment
Boeing X-53 Active Aeroelastic Wing
Bogdan Maglich
Bogdanov Affair
Bogoliubov transformation
Bogoliubov–Parasyuk theorem
Bogolyubov Prize (NASU)
Bogolyubov Prize for young scientists
Bogomol'nyi-Prasad-Sommerfield bound
Bogomol'nyi–Prasad–Sommerfield bound
Bohm diffusion
Bohr magneton
Bohr model
Bohr radius
Bohr–Einstein debates
Bohr–Sommerfeld theory
Bohr–van Leeuwen theorem
Bohumil Kučera
Boiling point
Boilover
Bolometer
Bolometric correction
Boltzmann's entropy formula
Boltzmann-Matano analysis
Boltzmann Medal
Boltzmann constant
Boltzmann distribution
Boltzmann entropy
Boltzmann equation
Boltzmann factor
Boltzmann relation
Bond albedo
Bond number
Bondi k-calculus
Bonding in solids
Bonnard J. Teegarden
Bonner sphere
Bonnet's theorem
Bonnor beam
Boojum (superfluidity)
Book of Optics
Bootstrap model
Bootstrap paradox
Borda–Carnot equation
Borexino
Boris Aleksandrovich Mamyrin
Boris Altshuler
Boris Bakhmeteff
Boris Borisovich Galitzine
Boris Chirikov
Boris Gerasimovich
Boris Hessen
Boris Kerner
Boris Laschka
Boris Nikolsky
Boris P. Stoicheff
Boris Pavlovich Belousov
Boris Podolsky
Boris Rauschenbach
Boris Vorontsov-Velyaminov
Born approximation
Born coordinates
Born probability
Born rigidity
Born rule
Born–Huang approximation
Born–Infeld model
Born–Infeld theory
Born–von Karman boundary condition
Borrmann effect
Bose gas
Bosenova
Bose–Einstein condensate
Bose–Einstein condensation (network theory)
Bose–Einstein correlations
Bose–Einstein statistics
Bose–Hubbard model
Boson
Boson star
Bosonic field
Bosonic string theory
Bosonization
Bottom Lambda baryon
Bottom eta meson
Bottom quark
Bottomness
Bouguer's law
Bouguer anomaly
Bouguer plate
Bound state
Boundary-layer thickness
Boundary conformal field theory
Boundary element method
Boundary layer
Boundary layer control
Boundary layer suction
Boundary layer transition
Boundary lubrication
Boussinesq approximation (buoyancy)
Boussinesq approximation (water waves)
Bousso's holographic bound
Bow shocks in astrophysics
Bow shock (aerodynamics)
Bow wave
Bowen ratio
Box orbit
Boyce McDaniel
Boyd Bartlett
Boyer–Lindquist coordinates
Boyle's law
Bra–ket notation
Brackett series
Bragg's law
Bragg diffraction
Bragg peak
Bragg–Gray cavity theory
Braid statistics
Brake force
Bram van Leer
Branches of physics
Branching fraction
Brandon Carter
Brane cosmology
Brans–Dicke theory
Bravais lattice
Brayton cycle
Breaking wave
Breakthrough Propulsion Physics Program
Breather
Brebis Bleaney
Bred vector
Breit equation
Bremermann's limit
Bremsstrahlung
Brendan Scaife
Brewster's angle
Brewster angle microscope
Brian Cox (physicist)
Brian David Josephson
Brian Greene
Brian L. DeMarco
Brian May
Brian Pippard
Brian Schmidt
Brian Spalding
Brian Swimme
Bridge scour
Bridgman's thermodynamic equations
Bridgman effect
Bridgman–Stockbarger technique
Brightest cluster galaxy
Brillouin and Langevin functions
Brillouin scattering
Brillouin zone
Brinell scale
Brinkman number
Brinkmann coordinates
British Atomic Scientists Association
British Geophysical Association
Brittleness
Broad iron K line
Broken symmetry
Brooke Benjamin
Brookhaven National Laboratory
Brosl Hasslacher
Brown dwarf
Brown dwarf desert
Brownian dynamics
Brownian motor
Brownian noise
Brownian ratchet
Bruce Allen (physicist)
Bruce Bolt
Bruce Cork
Bruce H. Billings
Bruce Maccabee
Bruce Winstein
Bruno Augenstein
Bruno Bertotti
Bruno Pontecorvo
Bruno Rossi
Bruno Rossi Prize
Bruno Thüring
Bruno Touschek
Bruno Zumino
Brunt–Väisälä frequency
Bruria Kaufman
Brush discharge
Bryan Higgins
Bryce DeWitt
Bubble chamber
Bubble fusion
Bubble ring
Bubble universe theory
Bucket argument
Buckingham (unit)
Buckingham π theorem
Buckley–Leverett equation
Buckling
Buckypaper
Bud Grace
Buffer (optical fiber)
Building engineering physics
Bulk density
Bulk modulus
Bulk temperature
Bulletin of the Atomic Scientists
Bulletin of the Lebedev Physics Institute
Bullough–Dodd model
Bumblebee models
Bunji Sakita
Bunsaku Arakatsu
Buoyancy
Burgers' equation
Burgers material
Burgers vector
Burkard Hillebrands
Burkhard Heim
Burns temperature
Burnup
Burst noise
Burt Ovrut
Burton Richter
Busemann biplane
Buttered cat paradox
Butterfly effect
Béla Karlovitz
Bülent Atalay
B–Bbar oscillation

Indexes of physics articles